Westtown School is a Quaker, coeducational, college preparatory day and boarding school for students in pre-kindergarten through twelfth grade, located in West Chester, Pennsylvania, United States, 20 miles west of Philadelphia. Founded in 1799 by the Religious Society of Friends.

Westtown is a Quaker school affiliated with the Friends General Conference branch of the Religious Society of Friends. The school requires all students to attend Meeting for Worship together with adults in the community who voluntarily attend (boarding students must attend Westtown Monthly Meeting on Sundays as well). Westtown uses the traditional Quaker practice of coming to unity in making some high-level decisions.

Westtown has been coeducational since its 1799 founding. Westtown students come from 16 states and 13 countries.

History
Westtown School opened on May 6, 1799. Philadelphia Quakers founded the school after raising money to build a boarding school and purchasing land a full day's carriage ride from Philadelphia—where they could provide a "guarded education in a healthy environment" away from the secular influences of the city. For many years, Westtown was nearly self-sufficient, with the campus providing raw materials used in the construction of its buildings and food for the people who lived and worked at the school. Westtown is the oldest continuously operating co-educational boarding school in the United States.

Boys and girls had separate classes until about 1870. Boys learned useful skills such as woodshop, surveying, and bookkeeping, and girls had classes like sewing. However, Westtown eventually recognized that students of both genders should know basic academic subjects such as reading, penmanship, grammar, mathematics, geography, and science.

The 1880s brought physical changes to Westtown. The main building was replaced with a structure designed by architect Addison Hutton, completed in 1888, and still in use today. During the 20th century, the student body and curriculum became more diverse. For example, the school added visual and performing arts, and non-Quakers, African-American, and international students were eventually admitted.

Westtown's Esther Duke Archives is a facility dedicated to collecting and maintaining materials relating to the people and history of the school.

The 2018 documentary, We Town, is about the 2016-2017 Upper School Basketball Team, featuring Mo Bamba and Cam Reddish. It chronicles the quest of the team to win the State Championship.

Campus
Westtown is located on a campus in southern Pennsylvania. The campus is 600 acres, including a 14.5-acre lake, arboretum, frog pond, 14 playing fields, stadium tennis courts, organic farm, Lower School mini-farm, medicine wheel garden, wooded cross country course, and 21-element ropes course.

Notable alumni

 Samuel Leeds Allen (1841–1918), inventor of the Flexible Flyer, the world's first steerable runner sled
 Donald Baechler (1956–2022), Class of 1973, painter and sculptor
 Mo Bamba, Class of 2017, American professional basketball player
 Anna Cox Brinton (1887–1969), classics scholar, Quaker worker overseas, administrator at Pendle Hill
 John Cassin, ornithologist
 Marysol Castro (1976–), weather anchor for ABC's Good Morning America Weekend Edition
 Laetitia Moon Conard (1871–1946), college instructor and politician in Iowa
 Gilbert Cope (1840–1928), genealogist and historian of Chester County, Pennsylvania
 Steve Curwood, Class of 1965, is host of NPR's Living on Earth environmental news series
 Anna Fang, Class of 2000, Chinese venture capitalist, CEO of ZhenFund
 Jim Fowler (1930–2019), Class of 1947, Conservationist and wildlife correspondent/show host - Mutual of Omaha's Wild Kingdom
 Benjamin Hallowell, president of Maryland Agricultural College
 Isaac Israel Hayes (1822-1881), Arctic explorer, physician and politician
 Arthur W. Hummel, Jr. Class of 1938, American diplomat; U.S. ambassador to China, 1981–1985
 Richard T. James (1914–1974), with his wife, invented the Slinky
 Dereck Lively II, Class of 2022, American collegiate basketball player
 Rachel Lloyd (1839-1900), chemist
 Rebecca Lukens (1794–1854) Considered first woman industrialist in the United States.
 Edward Mifflin, Class of 1941, Pennsylvania State Representative
 Herb Pennock, Class of 1915, Major League Baseball player and manager, baseball Hall of Fame
 Cameron Reddish, Class of 2018, basketball player for the New York Knicks
 Kevin Roose, technology columnist for the New York Times
 Holland Taylor (1943–), Class of 1960, Emmy Award-winning American actress
 Garrick Utley, Class of 1957, a correspondent for CNN's New York bureau
 Don Wildman, Class of 1979, the current host and narrator of Cities of the Underworld on History
 Anthony H. Williams, Class of 1975, Pennsylvania State Senator, 8th District

Photo gallery

References

External links
Westtown Website
A visitor's impression of the school published in 1861
Boarding School Review
YouTube: Westtown School

Boarding schools in Pennsylvania
Private elementary schools in Pennsylvania
Private middle schools in Pennsylvania
Private high schools in Pennsylvania
Educational institutions established in 1799
1799 establishments in Pennsylvania
Quaker schools in Pennsylvania
Schools in Chester County, Pennsylvania
Private high schools in the United States
High school basketball
Basketball teams in Pennsylvania
Quaker schools